In statistics and statistical physics, the Metropolis–Hastings algorithm is a Markov chain Monte Carlo (MCMC) method for obtaining a sequence of random samples from a probability distribution from which direct sampling is difficult. This sequence can be used to approximate the distribution (e.g. to generate a histogram) or to compute an integral (e.g. an expected value).  Metropolis–Hastings and other MCMC algorithms are generally used for sampling from multi-dimensional distributions, especially when the number of dimensions is high.  For single-dimensional distributions, there are usually other methods (e.g. adaptive rejection sampling) that can directly return independent samples from the distribution, and these are free from the problem of autocorrelated samples that is inherent in MCMC methods.

History
The algorithm is named for Nicholas Metropolis and W.K. Hastings, coauthors of a 1953 paper, entitled Equation of State Calculations by Fast Computing Machines, with Arianna W. Rosenbluth, Marshall Rosenbluth, Augusta H. Teller and Edward Teller. For many years the algorithm was known simply as the Metropolis algorithm. The paper proposed the algorithm for the case of symmetrical proposal distributions, but in 1970, Hastings extended it to the more general case. The generalized method was eventually identified by both names, although the first use of the term "Metropolis-Hastings algorithm" is unclear; it may have first appeared in a 1995 review by Chib and Greenberg.

Some controversy exists with regard to credit for development of the Metropolis algorithm.  Metropolis, who was familiar with the computational aspects of the method, had coined the term "Monte Carlo" in an earlier article with Stanisław Ulam, and led the group in the Theoretical Division that designed and built the MANIAC I computer used in the experiments in 1952.  However, prior to 2003 there was no detailed account of the algorithm's development.  Shortly before his death, Marshall Rosenbluth attended a 2003 conference at LANL marking the 50th anniversary of the 1953 publication.  At this conference, Rosenbluth described the algorithm and its development in a presentation titled "Genesis of the Monte Carlo Algorithm for Statistical Mechanics".  Further historical clarification is made by Gubernatis in a 2005 journal article recounting the 50th anniversary conference. Rosenbluth makes it clear that he and his wife Arianna did the work, and that Metropolis played no role in the development other than providing computer time.

This contradicts an account by Edward Teller, who states in his memoirs that the five authors of the 1953 article worked together for "days (and nights)". In contrast, the detailed account by Rosenbluth credits Teller with a crucial but early suggestion to "take advantage of statistical mechanics and take ensemble averages instead of following detailed kinematics".  This, says Rosenbluth, started him thinking about the generalized Monte Carlo approach – a topic which he says he had discussed often with John Von Neumann.  Arianna Rosenbluth recounted (to Gubernatis in 2003) that Augusta Teller started the computer work, but that Arianna herself took it over and wrote the code from scratch.  In an oral history recorded shortly before his death, Rosenbluth again credits Teller with posing the original problem, himself with solving it, and Arianna with programming the computer.

Intuition
The Metropolis–Hastings algorithm can draw samples from any probability distribution with probability density , provided that we know a function  proportional to the density  and the values of  can be calculated. The requirement that  must only be proportional to the density, rather than exactly equal to it, makes the Metropolis–Hastings algorithm particularly useful, because calculating the necessary normalization factor is often extremely difficult in practice.

The Metropolis–Hastings algorithm generates a sequence of sample values in such a way that, as more and more sample values are produced, the distribution of values more closely approximates the desired distribution. These sample values are produced iteratively, with the distribution of the next sample being dependent only on the current sample value, thus making the sequence of samples into a Markov chain. Specifically, at each iteration, the algorithm picks a candidate for the next sample value based on the current sample value. Then, with some probability, the candidate is either accepted, in which case the candidate value is used in the next iteration, or it is rejected in which case the candidate value is discarded, and current value is reused in the next iteration. The probability of acceptance is determined by comparing the values of the function  of the current and candidate sample values with respect to the desired distribution.

For the purpose of illustration, the Metropolis algorithm, a special case of the Metropolis–Hastings algorithm where the proposal function is symmetric, is described below.

Metropolis algorithm (symmetric proposal distribution)
Let  be a function that is proportional to the desired probability density function  (a.k.a. a target distribution).
 Initialization: Choose an arbitrary point  to be the first observation in the sample and choose an arbitrary probability density  (sometimes written ) that suggests a candidate for the next sample value , given the previous sample value . In this section,  is assumed to be symmetric; in other words, it must satisfy . The function  is referred to as the proposal density or jumping distribution.
 For each iteration t:
 Generate a candidate  for the next sample by picking from the distribution .
 Calculate the acceptance ratio , which will be used to decide whether to accept or reject the candidate. Because f is proportional to the density of P, we have that .
 Accept or reject: 
 Generate a uniform random number .
 If , then accept the candidate by setting ,
 If , then reject the candidate and set  instead.

This algorithm proceeds by randomly attempting to move about the sample space, sometimes accepting the moves and sometimes remaining in place. If we attempt to move to a point that is more probable than the existing point (i.e. a point in a higher-density region of  corresponding to an ), we will always accept the move. However, if we attempt to move to a less probable point, we will sometimes reject the move, and the larger the relative drop in probability, the more likely we are to reject the new point. Intuitively, this is why this algorithm works and returns samples that follow the desired distribution with density .

Compared with an algorithm like adaptive rejection sampling that directly generates independent samples from a distribution, Metropolis–Hastings and other MCMC algorithms have a number of disadvantages:
 The samples are correlated.  Even though over the long term they do correctly follow , a set of nearby samples will be correlated with each other and not correctly reflect the distribution. This means that effective sample sizes can be significantly lower than the number of samples actually taken, leading to large errors.
 Although the Markov chain eventually converges to the desired distribution, the initial samples may follow a very different distribution, especially if the starting point is in a region of low density. As a result, a burn-in period is typically necessary, where an initial number of samples are thrown away.

On the other hand, most simple rejection sampling methods suffer from the "curse of dimensionality", where the probability of rejection increases exponentially as a function of the number of dimensions.  Metropolis–Hastings, along with other MCMC methods, do not have this problem to such a degree, and thus are often the only solutions available when the number of dimensions of the distribution to be sampled is high.  As a result, MCMC methods are often the methods of choice for producing samples from hierarchical Bayesian models and other high-dimensional statistical models used nowadays in many disciplines.

In multivariate distributions, the classic Metropolis–Hastings algorithm as described above involves choosing a new multi-dimensional sample point.  When the number of dimensions is high, finding the suitable jumping distribution to use can be difficult, as the different individual dimensions behave in very different ways, and the jumping width (see above) must be "just right" for all dimensions at once to avoid excessively slow mixing.  An alternative approach that often works better in such situations, known as Gibbs sampling, involves choosing a new sample for each dimension separately from the others, rather than choosing a sample for all dimensions at once. That way, the problem of sampling from potentially high-dimensional space will be reduced to a collection of problems to sample from small dimensionality. This is especially applicable when the multivariate distribution is composed of a set of individual random variables in which each variable is conditioned on only a small number of other variables, as is the case in most typical hierarchical models.  The individual variables are then sampled one at a time, with each variable conditioned on the most recent values of all the others.  Various algorithms can be used to choose these individual samples, depending on the exact form of the multivariate distribution: some possibilities are the adaptive rejection sampling methods, the  adaptive rejection Metropolis sampling algorithm, a simple one-dimensional Metropolis–Hastings step, or slice sampling.

Formal derivation
The purpose of the Metropolis–Hastings algorithm is to generate a collection of states according to a desired distribution . To accomplish this, the algorithm uses a Markov process, which asymptotically reaches a unique stationary distribution  such that .

A Markov process is uniquely defined by its transition probabilities , the probability of transitioning from any given state  to any other given state . It has a unique stationary distribution  when the following two conditions are met:
 Existence of stationary distribution: there must exist a stationary distribution . A sufficient but not necessary condition is detailed balance, which requires that each transition  is reversible: for every pair of states , the probability of being in state  and transitioning to state  must be equal to the probability of being in state  and transitioning to state , .
 Uniqueness of stationary distribution: the stationary distribution  must be unique. This is guaranteed by ergodicity of the Markov process, which requires that every state must (1) be aperiodic—the system does not return to the same state at fixed intervals; and (2) be positive recurrent—the expected number of steps for returning to the same state is finite.

The Metropolis–Hastings algorithm involves designing a Markov process (by constructing transition probabilities) that fulfills the two above conditions, such that its stationary distribution  is chosen to be . The derivation of the algorithm starts with the condition of detailed balance:

 

which is re-written as

 

The approach is to separate the transition in two sub-steps; the proposal and the acceptance-rejection. The proposal distribution  is the conditional probability of proposing a state  given , and the acceptance distribution  is the probability to accept the proposed state . The transition probability can be written as the product of them:

 

Inserting this relation in the previous equation, we have

 

The next step in the derivation is to choose an acceptance ratio that fulfills the condition above. One common choice is the Metropolis choice:

 

The Metropolis–Hastings algorithm can thus be written as follows:
 Initialise 
 Pick an initial state .
 Set .
 Iterate
 Calculate the acceptance probability .
 Accept or reject:
 generate a uniform random number ;
 if , then accept the new state and set ;
 if , then reject the new state, and copy the old state forward .
 Increment: set .

Provided that specified conditions are met, the empirical distribution of saved states  will approach . For distribution on discrete state spaces, it has to be of the order of the autocorrelation time of the Markov process.

It is important to notice that it is not clear, in a general problem, which distribution  one should use or the number of iterations necessary for proper estimation; both are free parameters of the method, which must be adjusted to the particular problem in hand.

Use in numerical integration

A common use of Metropolis–Hastings algorithm is to compute an integral. Metropolis–Hastings can estimate an integral of the form of

 

where  is a (measurable) function of interest. 

For example, consider a statistic  and its probability distribution , which is a marginal distribution. Formally,  can be written as

 
and, thus, estimating  can be accomplished by estimating the expected value of the indicator function , which is 1 when  and zero otherwise.
The Metropolis–Hastings algorithm can be used here to sample (rare) states more likely and thus increase the number of samples used to estimate  on the tails. This can be done e.g. by using a sampling distribution  to favor those states (e.g.  with ).

Step-by-step instructions
To follow the Metropolis–Hastings algorithm, we next draw a new proposal state  with probability density  and calculate a value

 

where

 

is the probability (e.g., Bayesian posterior) ratio between the proposed sample  and the previous sample , and

 

This is equal to 1 if the proposal density is symmetric.
Then the new state  is chosen according to the following rules.

 If 
 
 else:
 

The Markov chain is started from an arbitrary initial value , and the algorithm is run for many iterations until this initial state is "forgotten".  These samples, which are discarded, are known as burn-in. The remaining set of accepted values of  represent a sample from the distribution .

If a Gaussian proposal density  is used, the variance parameter  has to be tuned during the burn-in period.
This is usually done by calculating the acceptance rate, which is the fraction of proposed samples that is accepted in a window of the last  samples.
The desired acceptance rate depends on the target distribution, however it has been shown theoretically that the ideal acceptance rate for a one-dimensional Gaussian distribution is about 50%, decreasing to about 23% for an -dimensional Gaussian target distribution. These guidelines can work well when sampling from sufficiently regular Bayesian posteriors as they often follow a multivariate normal distribution as can be established using the Bernstein-von Mises theorem.

If  is too small, the chain will mix slowly (i.e., the acceptance rate will be high, but successive samples will move around the space slowly, and the chain will converge only slowly to ).  On the other hand,
if  is too large, the acceptance rate will be very low because the proposals are likely to land in regions of much lower probability density, so  will be very small, and again the chain will converge very slowly. One typically tunes the proposal distribution so that the algorithms accepts on the order of 30% of all samples – in line with the theoretical estimates mentioned in the previous paragraph.

See also
 Detailed balance
 Genetic algorithms
 Gibbs sampling
 Hamiltonian Monte Carlo
 Mean-field particle methods
 Metropolis-adjusted Langevin algorithm
 Metropolis light transport
 Multiple-try Metropolis
 Parallel tempering
 Preconditioned Crank–Nicolson algorithm
 Sequential Monte Carlo
 Simulated annealing

References

Notes

Further reading 
 Bernd A. Berg. Markov Chain Monte Carlo Simulations and Their Statistical Analysis. Singapore, World Scientific, 2004.
 Siddhartha Chib and Edward Greenberg: "Understanding the Metropolis–Hastings Algorithm". American Statistician, 49(4), 327–335, 1995
 David D. L. Minh and Do Le Minh. "Understanding the Hastings Algorithm." Communications in Statistics - Simulation and Computation, 44:2 332-349, 2015
 Bolstad, William M. (2010) Understanding Computational Bayesian Statistics, John Wiley & Sons 

Monte Carlo methods
Markov chain Monte Carlo
Statistical algorithms